Enrique Corrales Martín (born 1 March 1982) is a Spanish professional footballer who plays as a left back.

Club career
Corrales was born in Seville, Andalusia. A product of Real Madrid's youth system, he played for the reserve side as a senior before moving to CA Osasuna for 2004–05. He made his La Liga debut on 29 August 2004 in a 1–1 home draw against Athletic Bilbao, for a total of 27 appearances during his first season.

In July 2008, Corrales signed for RCD Mallorca, being first choice in his first year although he lost his position in the final stretch, to also newly signed Ayoze. In the following campaign, as the Balearic Islands team finished in fifth position and qualified for the UEFA Europa League, he completely lost the battle for first-choice status, playing only seven matches but starting in the Copa del Rey.

With a new player making the first team in his position for 2010–11, Kevin García, Corrales featured even less for Mallorca (two league games, 128 minutes). On 28 July 2011, aged 29, the free agent joined another top-division side, penning a one-year contract with recently promoted Granada CF; however, after failing to convince manager Fabri, he cut ties with the Andalusians and signed with UD Las Palmas less than one month later.

Honours
Spain U16
UEFA European Under-16 Championship: 1999

References

External links

1982 births
Living people
Footballers from Seville
Spanish footballers
Association football defenders
La Liga players
Segunda División players
Segunda División B players
Real Madrid Castilla footballers
Real Madrid CF players
CA Osasuna players
RCD Mallorca players
Granada CF footballers
UD Las Palmas players
SD Huesca footballers
Bolivian Primera División players
Sport Boys Warnes players
Spain youth international footballers
Spanish expatriate footballers
Expatriate footballers in Bolivia
Spanish expatriate sportspeople in Bolivia